The Quinsigamond River is a river in central Massachusetts. It is a tributary of the Blackstone River and ultimately drains into Narragansett Bay.

It flows roughly southwards from its origin at Lake Quinsigamond at Worcester's eastern edge, past North Grafton where Bummet Brook enters, through Lake Ripple northwest of Grafton, and into Fisherville Pond at Fisherville, where it merges into the Blackstone River.

Mandaean ritual use 
The Mandaean-American community of Worcester regularly performs masbuta (baptism) rituals in Lake Quinsigamond, which is the source of the Quinsigamond River.

See also
List of rivers of Massachusetts

References

Rivers of Worcester County, Massachusetts
Rivers of Massachusetts
Tributaries of Providence River
Rivers in Mandaeism